Zeta Celestino Oliveros Gorres (born 18 April 1982) is a Filipino former professional boxer who challenged once for the WBO super-flyweight title.

Personal life
Gorres has a brother named Jun Gorres who was formerly a boxer but was stabbed to death in a street fight. His real name is a combination of those of his parents; Zeta (mother) and Celestino (father) Gorres. Gorres is married to Datchess Gorres and has four children.

Boxing career
Gorres became a boxing practitioner at 9 years of age. He began fighting as a professional on March 31, 2001. After winning 13 bouts in a row, he fought Edgar Rodrigo for the Philippine flyweight title on June 1, 2003. He, however, lost to Rodrigo by TKO in the 9th round which marked his first defeat.

One of Gorres' significant victories was his 1st round stoppage of Glenn Donaire, brother of pound for pound champion Nonito Donaire, on March 19, 2005. This was his first bout in the United States.

About a year later, he won the OPBF super flyweight title against Waenpetch Chuwatana.

On February 24, 2007, Gorres got a shot for a world title where he challenged WBO super flyweight champion Fernando Montiel in a bout held in Gorres' hometown. There, Gorres was docked a point twice (one in the 10th and another in the 12th round) for holding. Montiel won the fight and defended the title in a split decision.

He fought former IBF flyweight champion Vic Darchinyan on February 2, 2008, in an IBF title eliminator. The winner was to face then IBF super flyweight titlist Dimitri Kirilov of Russia who would later be dethroned by Darchinyan on August 2, 2008.  The match, however, was tarnished by poor refereeing and bottle-throwing from spectators who disliked it. The bout ended in a split draw. Nonetheless, Darchinyan won the right to fight for the championship because he was ranked higher than Gorres in IBF.

Gorres moved to bantamweight and won his first match in that division on March 14, 2009. There, he bested former IBF minimumweight champion Roberto Carlos Leyva in 7 rounds.

Career-ending injury

On November 13, 2009, after winning a 10-round bout against Luis Melendez in which he was knocked down with 30 seconds remaining in the final round, Gorres collapsed in the ring and was removed on a stretcher. He underwent surgery to relieve swelling to the left side of his brain. Originally, doctors were going to keep him in a medically induced coma for a few days, but Gorres reacted to the treatment much better than anticipated and came out of it. The injury he suffered ended his boxing career.

Going home
In February 2010, Gorres was well enough to fly home to the Philippines, where he was greeted at the airport by Philippine President Gloria Macapagal Arroyo. His physical therapy continued at Perpetual Succur Hospital in Cebu. His therapy involved the strengthening and conditioning of his muscles to help him regain the ability to do functional activities. Gorres began to regain his ability to walk and regained partial control of his left hand. He also underwent a series of surgeries for throat blockage.

References

External links

Living people
People from Agusan del Norte
People from Cebu City
1982 births
Bantamweight boxers
Southpaw boxers
Filipino male boxers